"Anysound" is a rock song by The Vines from their 2006 album Vision Valley. The song's video, directed by Michel Gondry, involves puppets. It was played in episode 21 in season 3 of The O.C. It has also appeared in Thrillville: Off the Rails.

Track listing

Charts

References

2006 songs
2006 singles
The Vines (band) songs
Music videos directed by Michel Gondry
Songs written by Craig Nicholls
Stop-motion animated music videos
Music videos featuring puppetry